WorldPride, licensed by InterPride and organized by one of its member organizations, is an event that promotes lesbian, gay, bisexual, transgender, and queer (LGBTQ pride) issues on an international level through parades, festivals and other cultural activities. The inaugural WorldPride was held in Rome in 2000. The host cities are selected by InterPride, the International Association of Pride Coordinators, at its annual general meeting.

Editions

WorldPride Rome 2000 

At the 16th annual conference of InterPride, held in October 1997 in New York City, InterPride's membership voted to establish the "WorldPride" title and awarded it to the city of Rome, Italy, during July 1 to July 9, 2000. The event was put on by the Italian gay rights group Mario Mieli along with InterPride.

Rome officials had promised to put up US$200,000 for the event, however bowing to ferocious opposition from the Vatican and conservative politicians, Rome's leftist mayor, Francesco Rutelli, on May 30, 2000 withdrew logistical and monetary support. Hours after his announcement, Rutelli mostly reversed himself in response to harsh criticism from the left. He restored the funding and promised to help with permits, but declined to back down on a demand that organizers remove the city logo from promotional materials. The event was staunchly opposed by Pope John Paul II and seen as an infringement on the numerous Catholic pilgrims visiting Rome for the Catholic Church's Great Jubilee. Pope John Paul II addressed crowds in St. Peter's Square during WorldPride 2000 stating, in regards to the event, that it was an "offence to the Christian values of a city that is so dear to the hearts of Catholics across the world."

The organisers claimed 250,000 people joined in the march to the Colosseum and the Circus Maximus, two of Rome's most famous ancient sites. It was one of the biggest crowds to gather in Rome for decades. Among the scheduled events were conferences, a fashion show, a large parade, a leather dance, and a concert featuring Gloria Gaynor, The Village People, RuPaul, and Geri Halliwell.

WorldPride Jerusalem 2006 

The 22nd annual conference of InterPride, held in October 2003 in Montreal, Quebec, Canada, with over 150 delegates from 51 cities from around the world in attendance, voted to accept the bid of the Jerusalem Open House to host WorldPride 2006 in the Holy City.

The first attempt to hold WorldPride in Jerusalem was in 2005, however it was postponed until 2006 because of tensions arising from Israel's withdrawal from the Gaza Strip. It was called “Love Without Borders” as a nod to the many barriers within Israel, and for gays and lesbians in other ways. World Pride was a key project of Jerusalem's Open House, the city's gay community centre.

After Jerusalem was selected as the WorldPride 2006 City, the city of Tel Aviv announced that it was cancelling its own annual Pride Weekend in 2006 to make sure that more Israelis attended the main march. As WorldPride started in 2006, the main parade was scheduled for August 6, but was strongly opposed by Israeli religious Orthodox Jews, Muslims and Christian leaders from the outset. However, due to the 2006 Israel-Lebanon conflict, Jerusalem's government cancelled the march, saying there were not enough soldiers to protect marchers.  A week of events took place as scheduled and included five conferences, a film festival, exhibitions, and literary and political events. The parade was cancelled but the Jerusalem Open House announced that it would hold a parade on November 10 after reaching an agreement with the police and the municipality.

WorldPride London 2012 

The 27th annual conference of InterPride, held in October 2008 in Vancouver, Canada, voted to accept the bid of Pride London to host WorldPride 2012 in the capital of the United Kingdom just ahead of the London Olympic and Paralympic Games and during the anticipated year-long celebrations of Queen Elizabeth II's Diamond Jubilee. Pride London planned a parade with floats, a large performance area in Trafalgar Square with street parties in Golden Square and Soho.

However, London's World Pride event was significantly "scaled back" at an emergency all-agencies meeting on June 27, 2012, nine days before the event was due to take place and after the festival fortnight had started. Pride London organisers had failed to secure the funds necessary for contractors of key areas of the work, and they announced that all activities were being cut or cancelled. The London Evening Standard reported that four contractors from the previous year's Pride event were owed £65,000 in unpaid debts, though this has been denied by Pride London. Consequently, the entertainment and stages were all cut, and licence applications for street parties in Soho withdrawn. Instead, the event plans included a Pride Walk (without floats or vehicles), and a scaled-back rally in Trafalgar Square. On July 5, the Metropolitan Police issued a licence regulations notice to all venues in Soho, reminding them that Pride London had no licence for street events in the Soho area, and therefore venues should treat WorldPride as "any normal day".

Peter Tatchell and former Pride London Associate Director James-J Walsh in an article for PinkNews criticised the management of Pride London's management of World Pride. Tatchell said "Whatever the rights and wrongs, this scaling down of WorldPride is a huge embarrassment for London and for our LGBT community. We promised LGBT people world-wide a fabulous, spectacular event. It now looks like WorldPride in London will go down in history as a damp squib. We're not only letting down LGBT people in Britain, we're also betraying the trust and confidence of LGBT people world-wide. This is an absolute disaster." Walsh added "This will mar the work of Pride London for years to come. Pride London has lost the focus of being an LGBT campaigning organisation, instead focusing on partying rather than politics, which is what the community needs when legislation around equal marriage and LGBT rights are still to be won both in the UK and around the world."

Following community pressure, Pride London, a registered charity since 2004, withdrew from organising future Pride events in London. In December 2012 the Mayor of London's Office awarded the contract to Pride in London.

WorldPride Toronto 2014 

Pride Toronto, in partnership with the city's tourism agency, Tourism Toronto, submitted a bid to host WorldPride 2014 in Toronto, Ontario, Canada from June 20 to June 29, 2014. The 28th annual conference of InterPride, held in October 2009 in St. Petersburg, Florida, United States, voted to accept the bid of Pride Toronto to host WorldPride 2014 for the first time in North America. In the first round of voting Toronto won 77 votes to Stockholm's 61. In the second round of voting Stockholm was eliminated and Toronto won 78% of the vote, fulfilling the 2/3 majority needed to finalize the selection process.

WorldPride 2014 festivities included an opening ceremony at Nathan Phillips Square featuring concert performances by Melissa Etheridge, Deborah Cox, Steve Grand and Tom Robinson, an international human rights conference whose attendees included Jóhanna Sigurðardóttir, Frank Mugisha and Edie Windsor amongst 2,400 attendees and 195 presenters from around the world, a gala and awards event, a variety of networking and social events including Canada Day and American Independence Day celebrations and an exhibition commemorating the 45th anniversary of the Stonewall Riots. Three marches occurred over the last three days of the ten-day celebration: the Trans march, the Dyke march, and the WorldPride Parade. Of these marches, the Trans and Dyke marches were more political, while the WorldPride Parade was more celebratory and included floats, musical acts, and dancers. All three marches were the longest of their kind in Canadian history. Over 12,000 people registered to march in the WorldPride parade and over 280 floats took part in the march. The parade lasted over five hours, marking it as one of the longest parades in Toronto's history. The parade's grand marshal was Brent Hawkes, the pastor of the Metropolitan Community Church of Toronto, and Georgian activist Anna Rekhviashvili served as international grand marshal.

There were many free public stages throughout Toronto's Church and Wellesley neighbourhood, featuring drag queen and king shows, burlesque shows, cultural performances, and musical acts including Carly Rae Jepsen, Peaches, Against Me!, Hercules and Love Affair, Chely Wright, Pansy Division, Lydia Lunch, The Nylons, k.d. lang, Carole Pope, Parachute Club, Dragonette and The Cliks. PFLAG sponsored a Pride flag, mounted on a flagpole atop the Churchmouse and Firkin pub, which automatically raised or lowered itself based on the volume of positive or negative commentary about LGBT issues on Twitter, and promoted the hashtag #raisethepride to attendees wishing to help raise the flag.

The event's slogan was "Rise Up". Parachute Club, whose 1983 single "Rise Up" has long been considered a Canadian gay anthem, released a contemporary remix of the song a week before the festivities.

The closing ceremony, held at Yonge-Dundas Square following the parade, featured performances by Tegan and Sara, Robin S, CeCe Peniston, Rich Aucoin, God-Des and She and Hunter Valentine.

When estimating the potential economic impact of WorldPride for Toronto, Pride Toronto officials said that Pride Week 2009 drew an estimated one million people to Toronto and contributed C$136 million to the city's economy, and stated that they expected WorldPride's impact to be about five times bigger. Results showed that WorldPride brought in C$791 million, nearly six times the 2009 figure.

WorldPride Madrid 2017 

In October 2012, InterPride's membership voted at its annual conference in Boston, Massachusetts, United States, to award WorldPride 2017 to the city of Madrid, Spain. The other candidate cities to host the event in 2017 were Berlin and Sydney, but Madrid won unanimously in the voting of more than 80 delegations from around the world.

This celebration in Madrid coincided in time with the 24th Europride, which was hosted for the second time in the Spanish capital (the first one was in 2007). It took place from June 23 to July 2, 2017. The event's slogan was "Whoever you love, Madrid loves you!", and the song chosen as the anthem was "¿A quién le importa?" by Alaska y Dinarama, which was specially adapted for the event with the collaboration of several Spanish popular singers among the LGBT community, including Fangoria – the band of two of the three former members of Alaska y Dinarama –.

WorldPride Madrid 2017 also coincided with two key anniversaries in the history of the LGBT community in Madrid and Spain: the 40th anniversary of the first demonstration in Spain in support of the rights of LGTB people – which took place in Barcelona in 1977 – and the 25th anniversary of the foundation of the State Federation of Lesbians, Gays, Transsexuals and Bisexuals (FELGTB, from Federación Estatal de Lesbianas, Gays, Transexuales y Bisexuales).

The opening ceremony of the event took place at the Calderón Theatre on Friday, June 23, 2017. Few days later, on Monday, June 26, the Madrid Summit, the International Conference on Human Rights, was inaugurated at the Autonomous University of Madrid. Several cultural events took place in the subsequent days, including the traditional and massive demonstration on July 1, with up to 52 floats going through the 2 kilometers between Atocha (Plaza del Emperador Carlos V) and Plaza de Colón. The WorldPride closing ceremony took place on July 2 at Puerta de Alcalá, giving the baton to New York City for the celebration of WorldPride 2019.

Stonewall 50 – WorldPride NYC 2019 
In 2019, New York and the world celebrated the largest international Pride celebration in history: Stonewall 50 – WorldPride NYC 2019, produced by Heritage of Pride and  commemorating the 50th anniversary of the Stonewall uprising, with five million spectators attending in Manhattan for Pride weekend alone. The event was held in conjunction with Stonewall 50, a celebration of the fiftieth anniversary of the Stonewall Uprising of June 28, 1969, which occurred in New York City's Greenwich Village neighborhood and is widely considered to mark the start of the modern Gay Rights Movement (now more commonly referred to as the fight for LGBTQIA+ rights).

WorldPride Copenhagen–Malmö 2021 

For the first time in history, WorldPride was held in two cities in two countries from 12 to 22 August 2021—Copenhagen, the capital of Denmark, and the Swedish neighbouring city Malmö, both in the Øresund Region. WorldPride was hosted by Copenhagen Pride, with Malmö Pride as a partner. The cities are a twenty/thirty-minute commute apart.

WorldPride was combined with EuroGames and other activities held simultaneously in that same area, with the event branded as 'Copenhagen 2021'. The WorldPride event will coincide with two LGBTQ anniversaries: seventy years since the world's first successful genital reconstructive surgery in Denmark in 1951; and fifty years after Gay Liberation Front's Danish chapter was founded in 1971.

The Crown Princess of Denmark was patron of the event, making her the first ever royal to serve as patron for a major LGBTQ event.

Despite the ongoing COVID-19 pandemic having an impact on major events, organisers of Copenhagen 2021 said in early January 2021 that they are "continuing to plan for full delivery of all Copenhagen 2021 events taking into the account the guidance and recommendations" of government agencies. Organisers have also said that they will not cancel or postpone the events, instead moving to a digital model if in-person events cannot be delivered.

Sydney WorldPride 2023 

InterPride, at their October 2019 Annual General Meeting of three hundred delegate organizations, held in Athens, Greece, chose Sydney, Australia, to host WorldPride 2023, the first time WorldPride was to be held in the Southern Hemisphere or Asia Pacific region. Sydney received 60% of the vote ahead of the other bid contenders Montreal, Canada (36%), and Houston, United States (3%).

WorldPride 2023 coincided with the 50th Anniversary of the first Australian Gay Pride Week, 45th Anniversary of the first Sydney Gay and Lesbian Mardi Gras and 5th Anniversary of same-sex marriage in Australia. According to the bid document, the stated objective of WorldPride Sydney 2023 was to celebrate the diversity of culture and identity in the Asia Pacific region, shine an international spotlight on First Nations culture, and draw attention to LGBTIQ+ human rights abuses.

Sydney WorldPride 2023, with its official theme 'Gather Dream Amplify', was held between 17 February and 5 March during Australia's summer. The festival's official theme song was We the People by Electric Fields. WorldPride consisted of a 17-day combined 45th Anniversary Sydney Gay & Lesbian Mardi Gras/WorldPride 2023 Festival. The centrepiece was a three-day LGBTIQ+ Human Rights Conference focusing on LGBTIQ+ people's experiences of discrimination and persecution in the Asia Pacific region and more broadly. Other signature events included:

 Sunday 19 February – Fair Day
 Friday 24 February – The Opening Ceremony features performances by Kylie Minogue, Charli XCX, Jessica Mauboy, Deborah Cheetham Fraillon, and Electric Fields; it was hosted by Courtney Act and Casey Donovan
 Saturday 25 February – Mardi Gras Parade
 Saturday 25 February – Mardi Gras Party, featuring Sugababes and Agnes
 Sunday 26 February – Laneway
 Sunday 26 February – Domain Dance Party, featuring Kelly Rowland
 First Nations Gathering Space
 Wednesday 1 March to Friday 3 March – Human Right Conference
 First Nations Gala Concert
 Mardi Gras International Arts Festival
30th Anniversary Queer Screen Mardi Gras Film Festival
 Saturday 4 March – Bondi Beach Party, featuring Nicole Scherzinger
 Sunday 5 March – Pride March (over the Sydney Harbour Bridge)
 Sunday 5 March – Closing Ceremony, featuring MUNA, Kim Petras and Ava Max.

Cancellation of WorldPride Taiwan 2025 

WorldPride 2025 was scheduled to be held in Kaohsiung, Taiwan, which was to be the first WorldPride event in Asia. However, the event was later cancelled over naming disagreements between InterPride and the Taiwanese organizers. Taiwanese organizers had been using the name "WorldPride Taiwan" during the application process. Nonetheless, they alleged that Interpride insisted the name be changed to "WorldPride Kaohsiung", removing "Taiwan" in the event's name, in the final contract. On the other hand, InterPride states it suggested the use of the name "WorldPride Kaohsiung, Taiwan".

Taiwan's Ministry of Foreign Affairs expressed regret: "Taiwan deeply regrets that InterPride, due to political considerations, has unilaterally rejected the mutually agreed upon consensus, and broken a relationship of cooperation and trust, leading to this outcome...Not only does the decision disrespect Taiwan’s rights and diligent efforts, it also harms Asia’s vast LGBTIQ+ community and runs counter to the progressive principles espoused by InterPride.”

See also 
 Europride
 Pride parade
 List of largest LGBT events

Notes

References

External links 
 WorldPride 2023, Sydney
 WorldPride 2021, Copenhagen
 WorldPride 2019, New York City
 WorldPride 2017, Madrid
 WorldPride 2014, Toronto
 WorldPride 2012, London
 InterPride

Pride parades
Recurring events established in 2000
Articles containing video clips